Copelatus angolensis is a species of diving beetle. It is part of the genus Copelatus of the subfamily Copelatinae in the family Dytiscidae. It was described by Peschet in 1924.

References

angolensis
Beetles described in 1924